René Besserve (1883 – 1959) was a French painter. His work was part of the painting event in the art competition at the 1924 Summer Olympics.

References

1883 births
1959 deaths
20th-century French painters
20th-century French male artists
French male painters
Olympic competitors in art competitions
Artists from Montbéliard